Stratford may refer to:

Places

Australia
 Stratford, Queensland, a suburb of Cairns
 Stratford, Victoria, a town in the state district of Gippsland East
 Stratford railway station, Victoria, a railway station on the Bairnsdale railway line in Stratford, Victoria
 Stratford, New South Wales, a town in the state district of Upper Hunter

Canada
 Stratford, Ontario, a city in Perth County
 Stratford, Prince Edward Island, a suburb of Charlottetown, the provincial capital
 Stratford, Quebec, a township in Le Granit Regional County Municipality

England

London
 Stratford, London, a locality of the London borough of Newham
 Stratford station, a Mainline, London Underground, London Overground, Elizabeth line, National Rail and Docklands Light Railway station
 Stratford International station, a main line railway and Docklands Light Railway station
 Stratford High Street DLR station, a Docklands Light Railway station
 Stratford West Ham (UK Parliament constituency) (1918–1950), East London
 Stratford-atte-Bow or Stratford, historical name of Bow, London
 Stratford Place, a small road in London, off Oxford Street, containing Stratford House

Suffolk
 Stratford St Andrew, a small village and a civil parish in the Suffolk Coastal District
 Stratford St. Mary, a village

Warwickshire
 Stratford-upon-Avon, a town in Warwickshire, known as the birth place of William Shakespeare.
 Stratford-on-Avon District, a local government district
 Stratford-on-Avon (UK Parliament constituency) (1885–1918, 1950–present)

Other counties
 Stratford Park, an area of Stroud, Gloucestershire
 Old Stratford, a village in Northamptonshire
 Stratford-sub-Castle, a suburb of Salisbury, Wiltshire
 Stony Stratford, a suburb of Milton Keynes,  Buckinghamshire

New Zealand
 Stratford, New Zealand, a town in the central Taranaki district
 Stratford (New Zealand electorate), a former parliamentary electorate, 1908–1946 and 1954–1978

United States
 Stratford, California, a census-designated place in Kings County
 Stratford, Connecticut, a town in Fairfield County
 Stratford station (Connecticut), Metro-North Railroad station on the New Haven Line
 Stratford, Illinois, an unincorporated community in Ogle County
 Stratford, Iowa, a city in Hamilton and Webster counties
 Stratford, New Hampshire, a town in Coos County
 Stratford, New Jersey, a borough in Camden County
 Stratford, New York, a town in Fulton County
 Stratford, Ohio, an unincorporated community
 Stratford, Oklahoma, a town in Garvin County
 Stratford, South Dakota, a town in Brown County
 Stratford, Texas, a city in Sherman County
 Stratford, Washington, an unincorporated community in Grant County
 Stratford, Wisconsin, a village in Marathon County
 Stratford Hall (plantation), a National Register of Historic Places site in Westmoreland County, Virginia

Other places
 Stratford-on-Slaney, a village in West Wicklow, Ireland

Education
 Stratford Hall (school), Vancouver, British Columbia, Canada
 Stratford Junior High School, Arlington, Virginia, U.S.
 Stratford University, a higher educational institution with campuses in the U.S. and India
 Stratford-upon-Avon College, in Stratford-upon-Avon, England
 Stratford Academy, in Macon, Georgia, U.S.

Other uses
 Stratford (surname), a surname

See also

 Stratford Tony, a village in Wiltshire, England
 Fenny Stratford, a constituent town of Milton Keynes, Buckinghamshire, England
 Stony Stratford, a constituent town of Milton Keynes, Buckinghamshire, England
 Water Stratford, a village near Buckingham, Buckinghamshire, England
 Stratfield Saye, a village in Hampshire, England, also called Stratford Saye, Stratford Sea, and Strathfieldsay
 Stratfield Turgis or Stratford Turgis, a village in Hampshire, England
 Stratfield Mortimer or Stratford Mortimer, a civil parish and village in Berkshire and part of Hampshire, England
 Stretford, a town in Trafford, Greater Manchester, England
 Stratford Press (Cincinnati), a bygone private press
 Stratford Shoal Light, a lighthouse in Long Island Sound, Connecticut
 The Stratford Residences, a building in Makati, Philippines
 Stafford (disambiguation)
 Strafford (disambiguation)
 Stratford High School (disambiguation)
 Stratford Shakespeare festival (disambiguation)